Back For More Live is the first concert DVD by Natalia, and documents one of the 40 shows she did in Belgium. The show was recorded in "De Zuiderkroon", Antwerp and was released 14 February 2005. It was the best-selling DVD for 15 weeks and it was the most-sold DVD of 2005.

Track listing
Unspeakable 
Back For More 
This Time
Alright, Okay, You Win 
Hanky Panky (by Madonna)
You Are (by Dolly Parton)
Some Things Are Meant To Be
Get Back 
Never Never 
Higher Than The Sun 
We're Gonna Have A Party 
I've Only Begun To Fight 
Queen of the Night (by Whitney Houston)
Fragile, Not Broken
What Don't Kill You Makes You Stronger 
Shelter 
I Want You Back 
Elvis medley (Heartbreak Hotel, Jailhouse Rock, A Big Hunk o' Love, Hound Dog & Trouble) 
Ridin' By 
Love Shack 
Risin' 
Think (by Aretha Franklin)
[You're Gonna Get There 
Tina medley (Simply the Best, Steamy Windows, Nutbush City Limits & River Deep Mountain High) 

Extra:
Behind the scenes (live recording & CD recording) 
Videoclips (I've Only Begun To Fight, Risin' & Fragile, Not Broken)

°This song became so popular with the audience that it was released as a B-side of Natalia's single "Ridin' By".

Charts

Musicians
Wietse Meys: Musical director & sax
Jeroen Van Melderen: Trumpet & keyboard
Martijn De Laat: Trumpet
Lode Mertens: Trombone
Steven Cornillie: Piano & keyboards
Kurt Lelièvre: Drums
Guy Remmerie: Percussion
Marc Cortens: Guitar
Marc Van Puyenbroeck: Bass
Helena Fontuyn: Backing vocals
Wen Bellens: Backing vocals
Liv Van Aelst: Backing vocals
Vivica Turrentine: Backing vocals

Dancers
Kris Castelijns
Oscar Millan
Christian Celini
Sarah Rafrari
Charissa Soentpiet
Natasha Debels

2005 video albums
Natalia (Belgian singer) albums
2005 live albums
Live video albums